Morten Welling Donnerup (born 26 August 1960) is a Danish former football player, who played professionally for Spanish club Racing de Santander from 1985 to 1986. Playing in the midfielder position, he scored one goal in 10 matches for the Denmark national football team.

Born in Odense, Donnerup started his career with local clubs Næsby IF and B 1913. He went on to play for AGF Aarhus, for whom he debuted on the Danish national team in June 1982. He had a short stint at Odense BK, before AGF sold him to Spanish club Racing de Santander in 1985. He played one season at Santander, scoring four goals in 29 games. While at Santander, Donnerup played his 10th and last game for the Danish national team in April 1986. He returned to Denmark once more, playing for AGF, Odense BK and Vejle Boldklub. Donnerup ended his career at a lower league club in Nørre Aaby.

External links
Danish national team profile
 LFP spanish statistics
 Vejle BK profile

1960 births
Living people
Danish men's footballers
Denmark international footballers
Denmark under-21 international footballers
Næsby Boldklub players
Aarhus Gymnastikforening players
Odense Boldklub players
Racing de Santander players
Vejle Boldklub players
Footballers from Odense
Danish expatriate men's footballers
Expatriate footballers in Spain
Danish expatriate sportspeople in Spain
Association football midfielders
Boldklubben 1913 players